Old Stone Church, also known as Green Spring Church and Stone Church, is a historic Lutheran church located at White Hall, Frederick County, Virginia. It was built about 1820, and rebuilt in 1838 after a fire.  It is a one-story, gable-roofed, cut stone church. Also on the property is a contributing cemetery with many headstones dating from the early to mid-19th century and two stone gate pillars.  It is the second oldest stone church surviving in Frederick County.

It was listed on the National Register of Historic Places in 2001.

See also
 National Register of Historic Places listings in Frederick County, Virginia

References

External links
 

Churches on the National Register of Historic Places in Virginia
Lutheran churches in Virginia
National Register of Historic Places in Frederick County, Virginia
Churches completed in 1820
Churches in Frederick County, Virginia
1820 establishments in Virginia